Raup Miller (September 13, 1904 – March 17, 1993) was an American politician who served as a member of the California State Assembly for the 28th District.

Early life 
Miller was born on September 13, 1904. A native of Lamar, Pennsylvania, he attended school in nearby Salona, Pennsylvania. As a young adult, Miller worked as an assistant for his father, a painter and carpenter.

Career 
Aspiring to attend college in California, Miller traveled west, stopping in Wyoming and Oregon before settling in the San Francisco Bay Area to attend the University of California, Berkeley. Prior to reaching California, Miller worked on a railroad and at a paper mill. Miller established a successful insurance business in Palo Alto, California and was elected to the California State Assembly in 1942. During his tenure in the legislature, Miller served in the United States Coast Guard during World War II. After retiring from the Assembly in 1947, he served as a member of the Palo Alto City Council. He also returned to college, completing his Bachelor of Arts degree in journalism from Humboldt State University in 1973. Miller also operated a small business in Placer County, California. In his retirement,

Miller also wrote and published collections of poetry.

Personal life 
Miller met his wife while studying at the University of California, Berkeley. They married in 1926 and had one daughter. Miller died on March 17, 1993, in Ukiah, California. He was 88.

References

United States Coast Guard personnel of World War II
1904 births
1993 deaths
People from Clinton County, Pennsylvania
Republican Party members of the California State Assembly
California State Polytechnic University, Humboldt alumni